The Payback is the 37th studio album by American musician James Brown. The album was released in December 1973, by Polydor Records. It was originally scheduled to become the soundtrack for the blaxploitation film Hell Up in Harlem, but was rejected by the film's producers, who dismissed it as "the same old James Brown stuff." A widely repeated story—including by Brown himself—that director Larry Cohen rejected the music as "not funky enough" is denied by Cohen. On the DVD commentary track for Black Caesar (to which Hell Up in Harlem is a sequel), Cohen states that executives at American International Pictures were already unhappy with Brown for delivering songs much longer than expected on Black Caesar and Slaughter's Big Rip-Off and opted for a deal with Motown Records instead. Cohen said the absence of Brown's music from Harlem still "breaks [his] heart."

It went to #1 on the Soul Albums chart for two weeks and cracked the Pop Albums chart in the Top 40. It was Brown's only studio album to be certified gold.

The Payback is considered a high point in Brown's recording career, and is now regarded by critics as a landmark funk album. Its revenge-themed title track, a #1 R&B hit, is one of his most famous songs and an especially prolific source of samples for record producers. Musically the album is largely cyclic grooves and jamming, but it also features departures into a softer soul-based sound on tracks like "Doing the Best I Can" and "Forever Suffering".

The album was reissued on single CD in 1992 with liner notes by Alan Leeds.

Track listing

Note
The track time for "Mind Power" is from the 1992 re-release of the album. The original 1973 version is 90 seconds shorter.

Personnel
 James Brown - lead vocals, electric piano
 St. Clair Pinckney - tenor saxophone, flute
 Maceo Parker - alto saxophone, flute
 Darryl "Hasaan" Jamison	- trumpet
 Jerone "Jasaan" Sanford - trumpet
 Isiah "Ike" Oakley - trumpet
 Fred Wesley - trombone
 Hearlon "Cheese" Martin - guitar
 Jimmy Nolen - guitar
 Fred Thomas - bass
 John "Jabo" Starks - drums
 John Morgan - percussion

Charts
Album – Billboard (North America)

Certifications

See also
List of number-one R&B albums of 1974 (U.S.)

References

External links
 Detailed Review of the album

James Brown albums
1974 albums
Albums produced by James Brown
Polydor Records albums
Albums produced by Andrew Roettger